The Oakland Athletics are a professional baseball team based in Oakland, California.  Before moving to Oakland in 1968, the team played in Philadelphia, Pennsylvania from 1901 through 1954 and in Kansas City, Missouri from 1955 through 1967.  The Athletics are members of the American League (AL) West division in Major League Baseball (MLB).  In baseball, the head coach of a team is called the manager, or more formally, the field manager. The duties of the team manager include team strategy and leadership on and off the field.  The team has employed 30 different managers in its history.  The current Athletics' manager is Mark Kotsay.

The franchise's first manager was Hall of Famer Connie Mack, who managed the team for its first fifty seasons.  Mack led the Athletics to nine AL championships and five World Series championships—in 1910, 1911, 1913, 1929 and 1930.  The team lost the World Series in 1905, 1914 and 1931, and no World Series was played when the Athletics won the AL championship in 1902.  After Jimmy Dykes replaced Mack as the Athletics' manager in 1951, no manager served more than three consecutive seasons until Tony La Russa, who became the Athletics' manager in 1986.  During this period, Dick Williams managed the Athletics to two consecutive World Series championships in 1972 and 1973, and Alvin Dark managed the team to a third consecutive World Series championship in 1974.  La Russa managed the Athletics to three consecutive AL championships from 1988 through 1990, winning the World Series in 1989.

Connie Mack holds the Athletics' records for most games managed, 7,466; most wins as a manager, 3,582; and most losses as a manager, 3,814.  Williams has the highest winning percentage of any Athletics manager, .603.  Four managers have served multiple terms as the Athletics' manager.  Connie Mack's son Earle Mack served as interim manager twice, in 1937 and 1939, when his father was ill. Hank Bauer served as the Athletics' manager from 1961 to 1962, and then again in 1969.  Dark served as the Athletics' manager from 1966 to 1967 and again from 1974 to 1975. Jack McKeon started the 1977 season as the Athletics' manager, was replaced by Bobby Winkles after 53 games, and then replaced Winkles part way through the 1978 season.  Five Athletics' managers have been inducted into the Baseball Hall of Fame: Connie Mack, Lou Boudreau, Joe Gordon, Luke Appling and Williams.  Mack and Williams were inducted into the Hall of Fame as managers. Boudreau, Gordon and Appling were inducted as players.

Key

Managers
Statistics current through October 4th, 2021

Managers with multiples tenures

Footnotes
Although Earle Mack managed the team for parts of the 1937 and 1939 seasons, he did so in the capacity of an interim manager while his father, Connie Mack, was ill.

References

 
Oakland Athletics
Managers